Marinus Cornelis "Marco" Minnaard (born 11 April 1989 in Wemeldinge) is a Dutch former professional cyclist, who rode professionally between 2012 and 2019 for the  and  teams. In June 2017, he was named in the startlist for the Tour de France.

Major results

2012
 3rd Kattekoers
 9th Overall Tour of China I
 9th Ronde van Midden-Nederland
 10th Grand Prix Pino Cerami
2014
 1st  Mountains classification La Tropicale Amissa Bongo
 4th Tour de Vendée
2016
 7th Overall Tour of Norway
 10th Overall Tour of Austria
2017
 1st  Overall Rhône-Alpes Isère Tour
1st  Points classification
 1st  Sprints classification Vuelta a Andalucía
 9th Overall Tour du Limousin
2019
 1st  Mountains classification Tour Poitou-Charentes en Nouvelle-Aquitaine
 9th Overall Rhône-Alpes Isère Tour

Grand Tour general classification results timeline

References

External links

1989 births
Living people
Dutch male cyclists
People from Kapelle
Cyclists from Zeeland
20th-century Dutch people
21st-century Dutch people